The Pro Football Writers of America (PFWA) first gave a National Football League Most Valuable Player Award in 1966 to Bart Starr. After an eight-season hiatus, the award returned in 1975. As with other PFWA awards, any member of the organisation is eligible to vote.

References 

National Football League trophies and awards
Most valuable player awards